Club Atlético de Levittown is a Puerto Rican football club which played in the now defunct Campeonato Nacional de Fútbol de Puerto Rico. Now the team plays in the Puerto Rico Soccer League first division. They now have a new ground in Levittown called Pista de Levittown where they played their first soccer game vs. Criollos, which they won 1-0.

References

Football clubs in Puerto Rico
1989 establishments in Puerto Rico